A pinnacle is an architectural feature.

Pinnacle(s) or The Pinnacle may also refer to:

Architecture
 The Pinnacle, mid 1960s live music venue also known as the Shrine Auditorium in Los Angeles
 The Pinnacle (Atlanta), a business center in the Buckhead district of Atlanta, Georgia
 The Pinnacle (Bristol, Tennessee), a shopping center and commercial development
 The Pinnacle (Chicago), a residential skyscraper in Chicago, Illinois
 The Pinnacle (Cleveland), a condominium in downtown Cleveland, Ohio
 The Pinnacle (Guangzhou), a skyscraper in Guangzhou, China
 The Pinnacle, Hong Kong, a housing estate in Tseung Kwan O, Hong Kong
 The Pinnacle (Nairobi), a skyscraper in Nairobi, Kenya
 The Pinnacle@Duxton, a residential complex in Singapore
 The Pinnacle at Symphony Place, a skyscraper in Nashville, Tennessee
 Pinnacle Apartments, the tallest building in Newcastle, Australia, also known as "The Pinnacle"
 22 Bishopsgate, a skyscraper in London, United Kingdom, originally to be named The Pinnacle

Businesses or products
 Pinnacle Airlines, a U.S. regional airline
 Pinnacle Armor, a U.S. armor manufacturer
 Pinnacle Books, a publisher of mass-market paperback books
 Pinnacle Brands, a former maker of trading cards
 Pinnacle Entertainment, a gaming and hospitality company
 Pinnacle Entertainment (United Kingdom), a former UK entertainment group
 Pinnacle Entertainment Group, a publisher of role-playing games and wargames
 Pinnacle Financial Partners, a U.S. banking and financial services company
 Pinnacle Foods, a packaged foods company headquartered in Mountain Lakes, New Jersey
 Pinnacle Golf
 Pinnacle Sports, an online gaming website
 Pinnacle Studio, a video editing application
 Pinnacle Systems, a digital video producer and distributor
 Pinnacle vodka

Landforms
 Pinnacle (geology), a column or spire of rock
 Pinnacle Islands, disputed islands controlled by Japan in the East China Sea
 Pinnacle Peak (disambiguation), any of several summits
 Pinnacle Rock (Connecticut), United States, a mountain summit
 Mount Pinacle, sometimes misspelled, in Coaticook, Quebec, Canada
 Mount Pinnacle, in Frelighsburg, Quebec, Canada
 The Pinnacle, Battle of Okinawa, a 30 ft spire near Arakachi, Japan
 The Pinnacle (Cape Breton), a peak in the Cape Breton Highlands, Nova Scotia, Canada
 The Pinnacle (Pennsylvania), United States, a peak
 Inaccessible Pinnacle, a mountain on the Isle of Skye, Scotland, United Kingdom
 The Pinnacles (disambiguation), several landforms
 Putangirua Pinnacles, in Wairarapa, New Zealand
 Trona Pinnacles, California, United States

Music
 Pinnacle (album), by the Irv Williams Trio, 2015
 Pinnacles (Edgar Froese album), 1983
 Pinnacles (J. J. Johnson album), 1980
 "Pinnacle", a song by Tone Damli, 2017
 "The Pinnacle", a song by Kansas from Masque, 1975

Places
 Pinnacle, Queensland, Australia
 Pinnacles, Queensland, Australia, a suburb of Townsville
 Pinnacles Station, a pastoral lease in Western Australia
 Pinnacle, Montana, United States
 Pinnacle, North Carolina, United States

Protected areas
In the United States:
 Pinnacle Rock State Park, Mercer County, West Virginia
 Pinnacle State Park and Golf Course, New York
 Pinnacles National Park, California

Other uses
 Pinnacle (Mayfair Games), a 1986 fantasy role-playing game adventure
 Pinnacle (TV program), a 1982–2003 American weekend news program on CNN
 Pinnacle, a reporting flagword in the United States military nuclear incident terminology
 Pinnacle, a barley variety
 The Pinnacle (professional wrestling), a professional wrestling stable led by Maxwell Jacob Friedman

See also
 Pinochle, a card game